Nallichery is a village in the Kudavasal taluk of Thiruvarur district, Tamil Nadu, India.

Demographics 

As per the 2001 census, Nallichery had a total population of 1088 with 524 males and 564 females. The sex ratio was 1076. The literacy rate was 85.91.

References 

 

Villages in Thanjavur district